Morten Qvenild (born 31 August 1978) is a Norwegian jazz pianist, band leader, and producer.

Career

Qvenild started his jazz career in the big band Ung Musikk in 1995, followed by studies on the Jazz program at the Norges Musikkhøgskole. He used to play in Østenfor Sol with Ole Jørn Myklebust, with Myklebust's OJ Trio, Shining (1999–2003), and Jaga Jazzist (2000–2002).

Since 2000 Qvenild is the "orchestra" of Susanna & the Magical Orchestra and an original member of Solveig Slettahjell's Slow Motion Quintet as well a duo partner. Beyond these enduring collaborations Qvenild is also involved in the Jon Klette Quartet, The National Bank and he toured with Nils Petter Molvær's Khmer and with Bertine Zetlitz Band (2003 and 2004).

In 2003 Morten Qvenild founded the trio In the Country with co-students Roger Arntzen (bass) and Pål Hausken (drums). They recorded five albums for Rune Grammofon. On the latter two –Whiteout (2009) and the live recorded Sounds and Sights (2011)– the band was joined by multi-instrumentalist Andreas Mjøs. Their last release was issued by the German ACT label.

In 2011 he performed with Marit Larsen a new version of Erik Bye's Vår beste dag. This has become NRK's tune in their profile campaign.

In 2017, he took part, playing multiple instruments such as upright piano, harpsichord, harmonium, dulcitone, mandolinette, autoharp and kokles on a-ha's MTV Unplugged recording of the Live Album, "Summer Solstice" in Giske, Norway and the Subsequent Unplugged tour in Jan and Feb 2018. He played keyboards for their Electric Summer tour in June through August 2018.

Honors
2004: JazzIntro Award with the band In the Country at the Moldejazz
2004: Spellemannprisen in the class jazz with Solveig Slettahjell and pop music with The National Bank
2007: Kongsberg Jazz Award
2016: Edvardprisen in the open class for the album Personal Piano

Discography

As leader
 2015: Personal Piano
 2016: The HyPer(Sonal) Piano Project - Towards A (Per)Sonal Topography Of Grand Piano And Electronics (Hubro Music)
 2019: Landet Bortanfor Landet - Område 51 (Grappa Musikkforlag)

As sideman
With In the Country
 2005: This Was the Pace of My Heartbeat (Rune Grammofon)
 2006: Losing Stones, Collecting Bones (Rune Grammofon)
 2009: Whiteout (Rune Grammofon)
 2011: Sounds and Sights (Rune Grammofon)
 2013: Sunset Sunrise (ACT)

With Susanna & the Magical Orchestra (Susanna Wallumrød)
2004: List of Lights and Buoys (Rune Grammofon)
2006: Melody Mountain (Rune Grammofon)
2009: 3 (Rune Grammofon)

References

External links 

Morten Qvenild Biography - Groove.no
Morten Qvenild Biography - Norsk musikkinformasjon MIC.no

Live Konsertfoto av Morten QvenildWhere?

}

1978 births
Living people
Musicians from Kongsberg
20th-century Norwegian pianists
21st-century Norwegian pianists
Avant-garde jazz musicians
In the Country members
Jaga Jazzist members
Norwegian jazz composers
Norwegian jazz pianists
Shining (Norwegian band) members
Spellemannprisen winners
The National Bank (band) members